Master of the Horse was a court clerk, who held one of the foremost rankings of the Royal Court of Sweden (next to the Överstekammarherren and just before the Överhovjägmästaren). He had the highest oversight of the Royal Stables, but this was governed by the First Crown Equerry, and he was for a time head of the state stud farm service in Sweden, thereby succeeding the former Riksstallmästaren in some of his duties.

Two such offices were occupied by the Royal Court in 1729, and appear to have been re-instated in 1763. During the period 1774–1792, the corresponding court official also worked at the Queen's Court and 1774–1782 and 1792–1795 at the Queen dowager's Court. "Överhovstallmästare" also appeared as a title with no corresponding office.

The office was abolished at the end of 1969.

List
1729–????: Carl Gustaf Güntherfelt
1763–1769: Johan Henrik Sparfvenfeldt
1769–1772: Jakob Wattrang
1772–1791: Adolf Fredrik Lewenhaupt
1791–1818: Gustaf Lewenhaupt
1818–1826: Claes Rålamb
1826–1826: Magnus Brahe
1826–1856: ?
1856–1859: Ferdinand Braunerhielm
1860–1874: Gustaf Adolf Fredrik Wilhelm von Essen
1875–1885: Rudolf Tornérhjelm
1886–1888: Carl Magnus Björnstjerna
1888–1908: Alfred Piper
1908–1912: Gustaf Gyldenstolpe
1912–1931: Fredrik Wrangel
1932–1957: Hans Ramel

See also
Crown Equerry

References

Swedish monarchy
Swedish titles